Anja Hümme (born 24 November 1967) is a German footballer. She played in four matches for the Germany women's national football team from 1986 to 1991.

References

External links
 

1967 births
Living people
German women's footballers
Germany women's international footballers
Place of birth missing (living people)
Women's association footballers not categorized by position